Three Blind Mouseketeers is a Silly Symphonies cartoon based on the nursery rhyme Three Blind Mice and the 1844 novel The Three Musketeers by Alexandre Dumas. Directed by Dave Hand and Jack Cutting, it stars Billy Bletcher.

Plot
The three blind mice are disguised as musketeers in a cellar. Captain Cat (the devious cat) sets a number of traps for the mice and goes to sleep. The mice come out to search for food, avoiding all the traps. When they uncork three bottles of wine, the corks hit Captain Cat on the nose. Captain Cat wakes up and starts chasing the mice, only ending up trapping one mouse, who starts asking for help from the other two mice reflecting on numerous bottles. Captain Cat thinks he is surrounded by mice and runs away, falling into a multitude of traps that he has prepared himself.

Voice cast
 Tall Mouseketeer: Pinto Colvig
 Captain Katt: Billy Bletcher
 Other two Mouseketeers: Walt Disney and Roy O. Disney

Syndication
The cartoon was aired on Good Morning, Mickey! on the Disney Channel.

Home media
The short has been released on home media several times. The first time was on a VHS release in 1985 on Walt Disney Cartoon Classics Limited Gold Edition II: The Disney Dream Factory: 1933-1938, then in the UK on VHS on Storybook Favourites Shorts: Three Little Pigs.

Its first DVD release was in 2003 on The Rescuers, followed on December 19, 2006, on Walt Disney Treasures: More Silly Symphonies, Volume Two. It was also released on Walt Disney Animation Collection: Classic Short Films Volume 2: Three Little Pigs in 2009 and on The Rescuers 35th Anniversary Edition (The Rescuers/The Rescuers Down Under) in 2012.

References

External links 
 

The encyclopedia of Disney animated shorts

1930s Disney animated short films
Silly Symphonies
1936 short films
1936 animated films
1936 films
Films directed by David Hand
Films produced by Walt Disney
Animated films about mice
Films based on nursery rhymes
1930s American films